Who Am I is the second full-length album released by B1A4 under WM Entertainment. The album was released on January 13, 2014, by WM Entertainment and their distributing label Pony Canyon Korea. The title song of the album, "Lonely (없구나), was produced by leader Jinyoung along with 7 other tracks in the album. CNU also took part in the composition with 2 self-produced songs.

Release and promotion
On December 31, 2013, WM Entertainment released teaser photos for the B1A4's 2nd Album on their official website, including a group picture and an individual teaser picture for each member. On January 2, B1A4 released a music video teaser for Lonely (없구나). On January 6, B1A4 released a music video teaser drama version for Lonely (없구나). On January 9, B1A4 released a medley teaser previewing 15 seconds of each song.

Track listing

Chart

References

2014 albums
B1A4 albums
Korean-language albums
Pony Canyon albums